Ileana Stana-Ionescu (born 14 September 1936 in Brad, Hunedoara) is a Romanian actress and politician. She made her debut in theatre in 1955. She was a member of the Chamber of Deputies from 2000 to 2004, representing the country's Italian minority.

In 2018, the actress dubbed the voice of Quuen from the animated movie "Great Mouse Detective".

References 

1936 births
Living people
People from Brad, Hunedoara
Romanian people of Italian descent
Members of the Chamber of Deputies (Romania)
Romanian actresses